The Metrobus network provides bus service throughout Miami-Dade County 365 days a year, operated by Miami-Dade Transit. It consists of about 93 routes and 893 buses, which connect most points in the county and part of southern Broward County as well.

Six routes operate around the clock: Routes 3, 11, 27, 38, L (No 24-hour service to Hialeah, all trips terminate at Northside Station) and S. Routes 246 Night Owl & Route 500 Midnight Owl operate from midnight to 5am. Route 77 (last bus from Downtown Miami 1:10am, first bus from Downtown Miami 4:10am) and other routes operate from 4:30am to 1:30am. Available via the Google Play Store and Apple App Store exist the GO Miami-Dade Transit app to track the different bus routes, to view the time of arrival at specific stops, purchase tickets for Metrorail, Metrobus, and Tri-rail. All Metrobuses are wheelchair accessible, in compliance with the Americans with Disabilities Act of 1990 and equipped with Bicycle racks.

Bus route 301 (Dade-Monroe Express) extends into Monroe County, reaching Marathon, where a transfer is available to a Key West Transit bus proceeding further into the Keys.  With the appropriate bus transfers, one can travel all the way from Key West to Jupiter entirely on public-transit buses. Metrobus has many connections to Metrorail and Metromover, also operated by Miami-Dade Transit, mainly in the city of Miami.

Added to the Metrorail on August 21, 2019 and Metrobus on December 23, 2019, Miami-Dade Transit riders are able to use their smartphones/smartwatches to pay (Apple Pay, Google Pay, Samsung Pay, Fitbit Pay, Garmin Pay) and be able to use their credit or debit card that is contactless enabled (Amex, Visa, Mastercard). As of the 2019 implementation of tap to pay, Discover cards via tap to pay, are not accepted systemwide.

History 

Bus ridership has reached as high as 293,000 daily, but is generally around a quarter million. It reached a high during the real estate bubble of the 2000s, then declined during the bad economy amid service cuts during the Great Recession, before rising again in the 2010s. From 2015 into 2016, bus ridership fell sharply, down to a low of 195,000 daily in June 2016, amid the lowest gas prices in over a decade, despite a locally strong economy and steady population gain. This during a time when much effort was going into enhancements, such as an air-conditioned bus shelter, mobile ticketing, and new rolling stock, including electric buses. Part of the problem is that buses, unlike other transit alternatives, are not exempt from the increasing traffic present. Nationally, bus ridership fell while rail ridership increased slightly in 2015.

South Dade TransitWay

The South Dade TransitWay (originally named the South Dade Busway) is a basic bus rapid transit system, or busway, in southern Miami-Dade County. It began operating from the Dadeland South Metrorail station to SW 112th Avenue on February 3, 1997 and was extended to SW 264th Street on April 24, 2005. The final  segment of the Busway extension to SW 344th Street in Florida City opened on Sunday, December 16, 2007. It is parallel to US1/ S Dixie Highway, and runs along the abandoned Florida East Coast Railway line.  It is an alternative to daily traffic congestion. The  roadway was built by the Florida Department of Transportation just for Metrobus routes and emergency vehicles. Express buses on the exclusive lanes shuttle passengers to and from Dadeland South Station (see Metrorail) in about an hour or less.

Both full-size and articulated buses operate on the Busway and in adjacent neighborhoods, entering the exclusive lanes at major intersections. Local and limited-stop service is offered between Florida City and Dadeland South Metrorail Station. Park & Ride lots along the busway are located at SW 152d Street (Coral Reef Drive), SW 168th Street (Richmond Drive), SW 112th Avenue, SW 244th Street, and SW 296th Street. At Dadeland South Station, riders transfer to Metrorail. Riders headed downtown can transfer from Metrorail to Metromover, which consists of three shorter downtown loops, at Government Center Station.

The South Miami-Dade Busway features 28 stops, all of which look like light-rail style stations. A multi-use path stretches the length of the Busway. The busway stops featured large shelters to provide protection from the sun and rain. These are currently being rebuilt with the reconstruction of the South-Dade Transitway.

The Institute for Transportation and Development Policy (ITDP), under its BRT Standard, has given the Busway a preliminary classification as a "Basic BRT" corridor.

Routes that use the Busway 
1- Serves the stop at 173rd street and a route that travels through Perrine, Florida and Quail Roost DR which every bus passes every half-hour.
31 Busway Local- serves all stops between northern end of the busway and Southland Mall, before looping to serve Cutler Bay shopping centers and the South Dade Government Office Complex
34 Busway Flyer- travels the entire length of the busway, but does not stop at any stops before SW 152nd Street. As of June, the route has been split and called the 34 and the 39, which now ends at South-Dade Government Center.
38 Busway MAX- travels the entire length of the busway, deviating from the route slightly to serve Southland Mall, and travelling beyond the end of the busway to serve Florida City shopping centers
52- begins at Dadeland North Metrorail Station, then runs along busway to SW 152nd street, before becoming a Richmond Heights and Goulds local route
252 Coral Reef MAX- begins at Dadeland South Metrorail Station, then runs along busway to SW 152nd Street, before becoming express route to Country Walk
287 Saga Bay MAX- begins at Dadeland South Metrorail Station, then runs along busway to SW 168th Street, before running as express route through West Perrine and Saga Bay

Busway vs. rail controversy
The Busway has been the site of many accidents, as some car drivers driving south on US 1 (which runs parallel to the Busway for much of its length) and looking to turn west do not stop at the red arrows that govern the right turn lane at an intersection that has a Busway crossing adjacent to it. They make a right turn and go right into the path of a bus that is entering the adjacent Busway intersection. Buses currently must slow down to  before crossing the intersection, and the police often patrol the intersections looking for red arrow runners. Surprisingly, even the intersections on which the Busway runs as far as two blocks west of US 1 suffer the same problem, with car drivers not seeing or flatly ignoring the red lights at SW 184th and 186th Streets. City planners and residents alike have commented that rather than dismantling the former Florida East Coast Railroad line for the busway, the Metrorail system could have been extended southward over the railway line.

Major Incidents
April 2012: In the early morning hours of Friday April 13, 2012, an SUV driving southbound illegally down the Busway (as it was known then) by a drunk driver at more than 100 miles per hour (against a 40 mile per hour speed limit) slammed into a mini-van traveling eastbound on SW 184th Street, t-boning the eastbound vehicle, continuing southbound before spiraling out of control, and stopped adjacent to the Northbound SW 184th Street station. One teen was killed, three others (including the drunk driver) were injured, and the drunk driver was arrested. Fortunately, no Metrobus drivers or passengers were injured or killed as no buses were passing through SW 184th Street or stopping at the SW 184th Street stations at the time of the crash. However, the crash caused delays to several Metrobus routes as portions of both SW 184th Street and the Busway were shut down for an extended period of time.

September 2017: On September 10, 2017, Hurricane Irma made landfall in Cudjoe Key as a Category 4 Hurricane. Although the TransitWay did not receive hurricane force winds, several canopies were damaged during the hurricane and subsequently removed. The replacement of canopies fell behind schedule and remains unfinished, .

February 2019: On February 6, 2019, a car and bus collided near SW 248th Street. There were no fatalities. However, fourteen people were injured, two seriously.

Future (Gold Standard Electric Bus Rapid Transit Line) 
The Miami-Dade Department of Transportation and Public Works broke ground on the South-Dade Transitway Corridor gold standard bus rapid transit line on June 4th, 2021. It will provide a direct transfer to the Metrorail at the Dadeland South Station, extending Miami-Dade Transit's rapid transit system up to Florida City. Opening of the gold standard BRT line is expected for March 2024. The new line will have 2 terminals and 14 new iconic BRT stations, all featuring fare gates, center platform boarding, all-door and level boarding, next bus arrival screens, air conditioned waiting areas, and other rail-like amenities. These stations can be converted to Metrorail stations in the future. Along the transitway, signal preemption and level crossing gates will be implemented so that BRT vehicles never stop at a light.  The BRT will use 60-foot battery-electric articulated buses. Also in the works is the proposed South-Dade Bus Maintenance Facility. It will be the first all-electric bus maintenance facility in Miami-Dade County and it will be located next to the Homestead Air Reserve Base. This proposed facility will charge and maintain the 100 60-foot battery-electric articulated buses of the South Corridor and will host parts and equipment for maintenance of the South Corridor's gate arms.

Ridership
Ridership detail by average daily ridership on weekdays by month, with yearly average and highest ridership month in bold. Note the generally lower ridership during the summer months and December, month of the long Christmas and holiday season. Ridership has been falling since 2014 amid widespread rider complaints, an aging fleet, and sharply declining gas prices beginning in late 2014. Starting in 2016, this was also affecting Metrorail ridership. By 2016, 70% of the bus fleet was considered beyond its expected useful life, as the county was in the process of buying 30 electric buses with an option for 20 more. This is well under 10% of a fleet of nearly 1,000 buses. Other upgrades included a new mobile ticketing and contactless payment system, as well as upgrades to bus stops, including covering shelter-less bus stops and air conditioning at select locations. By mid 2016, average daily ridership was over 100,000 below a pre-recession peak in November 2007, and May, June, July, and August 2016 were the lowest ridership months in over a decade. Some of the ridership loss may be accounted for by overlap and growth of the free Miami Trolley and other pseudo-bus systems. Very poor numbers in October 2016 across the entire system were partially blamed on one day of closures for Hurricane Matthew, which passed close to South Florida. Similarly, September 2017, the month of Hurricane Irma, saw even lower ridership. 2016 was the lowest ridership year since online records began in 1998. Summer 2017 saw weekday ridership decline another 10% on top of sustained decline. January 2018's ridership of 162,300 is the lowest since at least the 90s with the exception of the month Hurricane Irma hit. Annual ridership figures are rounded to the nearest 100.

See also
List of Metrobus routes (Miami-Dade County)
Transportation in South Florida

References

External links
 
 
Bus rapid transit in Florida
Bus transportation in Florida
Transportation in South Florida
Transportation in Miami-Dade County, Florida
1960 establishments in Florida